Events from the year 1962 in Kuwait.

Incumbents
Emir: Abdullah Al-Salim Al-Sabah 
Prime Minister: Abdullah Al-Salim Al-Sabah (starting 17 January)

Events

Former Minister of Public Health , Abdel Aziz Hamad alsaqer handing the graduation certificate to one of the graduates . with the minister of Public Health Abdel Aziz Ibrahim al Fulaij who invited the former minister to hand out the certificates since he was the founder of the Nursing school in Kuwait and beside MR. Saqer stands Dr. Sayyid Ahmad al Ma'dawi , the speaker of the ceremony , who also , on loan from A.R.E , is the deputy chief of the Health Education Department.

Births

 15 January - Zahrah al Kharji, Kuwaiti actress.
 11 July - Ahmed Al-Ahmed, fencer.
 28 October - Kifah Al-Mutawa fencer.
 4 December - Abdulaziz Al-Buloushi, footballer.

References

 
Kuwait
Kuwait
Years of the 20th century in Kuwait
1960s in Kuwait